National Route 79 is a national highway in South Korea connects Uiryeong County to Changnyeong County. It established on 25 August 2001.

Main stopovers
 South Gyeongsang Province
 Uiryeong County - Haman County - Changwon - Changnyeong County

Major intersections

 (■): Motorway
IS: Intersection, IC: Interchange

References

79
Roads in South Gyeongsang